Sicyophorus is a genus of archaeopriapulid known from the Chengjiang biota; synonymous with Protopriapulites haikouensis.

References

Priapulida
Prehistoric protostome genera

Cambrian genus extinctions